The UpStairs Lounge arson attack occurred on June 24, 1973 at a gay bar called the UpStairs (or Up Stairs) Lounge located on the second floor of the three-story building at 604 Iberville Street in New Orleans, Louisiana, in the United States. Thirty-two people died and at least fifteen were injured as a result of fire or smoke inhalation. The official cause is still listed as "undetermined origin". The primary suspect, a gay man with a history of psychiatric impairment named Roger Dale Nunez who had been ejected from the bar earlier in the day, was never charged and killed himself in November 1974. No evidence has ever been found that the arson was motivated by hatred or overt homophobia.  

Until the 2016 Orlando nightclub shooting, in which 49 people were murdered, the UpStairs Lounge arson attack was the deadliest attack on a gay club in U.S. history.

Background 
The club was located on the second floor of a three-story building at the corner of Chartres and Iberville Streets. Members of the Metropolitan Community Church, a pro-LGBT Protestant denomination, were there after service. The MCC was the United States' first national gay Christian fellowship, founded in Los Angeles in 1968; the local congregation had held services in the UpStairs Lounge's theatre for a while.

The fire was the third arson attack to affect the MCC, following a January 27, 1973, arson at the church's headquarters in Los Angeles (resulting in the destruction and collapse of the building with no injuries) and another 1973 arson at an MCC church in Nashville, Tennessee (also with complete destruction of the church and its furnishings but no injuries).

Incident
On Sunday evening, June 24, 1973, over a weekend when Christopher Street “Pride” celebrations took place in seemingly every major American city but New Orleans, the regular "beer bust" drink special attracted its usual blue-collar gay crowd to the UpStairs Lounge. That night’s beer bust, from 5:00 pm to 7:00 pm, attracted approximately 110 patrons. After the drink special ended, about 60 to 90 patrons remained; they listened to pianist George Steven “Bud” Matyi perform and discussed an upcoming MCC fundraiser for the local Crippled Children's Hospital.

At 7:56PM, a buzzer from downstairs sounded, and bartender Buddy Rasmussen, an Air Force veteran, asked Luther Boggs to answer the door, anticipating a taxi cab driver. Boggs opened the door to find the front staircase engulfed in flames, along with the smell of lighter fluid. Rasmussen immediately led some twenty patrons out of the back exit to the roof, where the group could access a neighbouring building's roof and climb down to the ground floor. Others saw the floor to ceiling windows as the most promising means of escape despite the fact that there were safety bars on the windows with a 14-inch gap between them to prevent dancers from breaking through the glass. Several people managed to squeeze through, some still burning when they reached the ground below. Luther Boggs was one who came through the window in flames after pushing his female friend through the gap. The flames on Boggs were extinguished by the owner of a neighbouring bar, but he died on the 10th of July (16 days later), from third degree burns to 50% of his body. 

Reverend Bill Larson of the MCC removed an air conditioning unit from the bottom of one of the floor to ceiling windows and was attempting to get out when the upper pane of glass fell on top of him, pinning him to the window frame half in the building and half out. His charred remains would be visible to onlookers for hours afterward, recorded in many pictures taken of the front of the building in the aftermath of the 16-minute fire. MCC assistant pastor George "Mitch" Mitchell managed to escape, but returned in an attempt to rescue his partner (they considered themselves married based on a civil ceremony they had two years previously), Louis Horace Broussard. Both died in the fire, their remains found clinging to each other. Mitchell's children were visiting from out of town and watched the same movie seven times as they waited for their father's return. Eventually, a friend took them to the airport and sent them home to their mother without telling them what happened to their father and his partner.

Firefighters stationed two blocks away found themselves blocked by cars and pedestrian traffic. One fire truck tried to maneuver on the sidewalk but crashed into a taxi. They arrived to find bar patrons struggling against the security bars and quickly brought the fire under control.

Victims 

Twenty-eight people died at the scene of the sixteen-minute fire, and one died en route to the hospital. Another 18 suffered injuries, of whom three, including Boggs, died.

Funerals and memorial services 
Many churches refused to hold funerals for the dead. Reverend William P. Richardson of St. George's Episcopal Church agreed to hold a small prayer service for the victims on June 25. Approximately 80 people attended the event. The next day, Iveson B. Noland, the Episcopal bishop of New Orleans, rebuked Richardson for hosting the service. Noland received more than 100 complaints from parishioners concerning the service, and Richardson's mailbox filled with hate mail.

Soon after two additional memorial services were held on July 1 at a Unitarian church and St. Mark's United Methodist Church, headed by Louisiana's Methodist bishop Finis Crutchfield and led by MCC founder Reverend Troy Perry, who came from Los Angeles to participate. Mourners exited through the church's main door rather than an available side exit, a demonstration of a new willingness to be identified on camera. Several families did not step forward to claim the bodies of the deceased. A few anonymous individuals stepped forward and paid for the three unknown men's burials, and they were buried with another victim identified as Ferris LeBlanc in a mass grave at Holt Cemetery. LeBlanc's family would not learn of his death in the arson attack until January 2015. In 2018, Robert L. Camina, director of the UpStairs Inferno documentary, announced in The Advocate that, after extensive research, one of the three unknown victims could finally be identified as 32-year-old Larry Norman Frost.

In June 1998, the 25th anniversary of the fire, as part of Gay Pride celebrations, a memorial service was organized by Rev. Dexter Brecht of Big Easy Metropolitan Community Church (also known as Vieux Carre MCC) and Toni J. P. Pizanie. It was held at the Royal Sonesta Hotel Grand Ball Room and attended by New Orleans Councilman Troy Carter, Rev. Carole Cotton Winn, Senior Rabbi Edward Paul Cohn of Temple Sinai, Rev. Kay Thomas from Grace Fellowship in Christ Jesus, Rev. Perry, and 32 members of the New Orleans community representing the victims. Carter then led a jazz funeral procession to the building on the corner of Chartres and Iberville Streets, the site of the club, and members of the local MCC laid a memorial plaque and wreaths at the grave. Among the attendees was the niece of victim Clarence McCloskey.

Investigation
The official investigation failed to yield any convictions. The only suspect in the attack was Roger Dale Nunez, who had been ejected from the bar earlier in the evening after fighting with another customer. Police attempted to question Nunez shortly after, but he was hospitalized with a broken jaw and could not respond. When questioned later, police records show, he did not appear nervous. Nunez had a witness who claimed that he had been in and out of the bar during the 10–20 minutes before the fire, and that he had seen nobody enter or leave the building. Because police observed that the witness was stressed, they dismissed the witness as a liar.

Nunez was diagnosed with "conversion hysteria" in 1970 and visited numerous psychiatric clinics. He was released from a treatment facility in the year before the fire. After his arrest, Nunez escaped from psychiatric custody and was never picked up again by police, despite frequent appearances in the French Quarter. A friend later told investigators that Nunez confessed on at least four occasions to starting the fire. He told the friend he squirted the bottom steps with Ronsonol lighter fluid, bought at a local Walgreens, and tossed a match. He did not realize, he claimed, that the whole place would go up in flames. Nunez killed himself in November 1974.

In 1980, the state fire marshal's office, lacking leads, closed the case.

Aftermath 
The space on the second floor formerly known as the UpStairs Lounge now contains business offices and a kitchen for the Jimani Lounge (established 1971), which is located on the first floor. The current owner, Jimmy Massacci, and his father, the former owner, personally witnessed the fire and its aftermath. The third floor, then owned by the UpStairs Lounge, remains unused and partially damaged. The building itself dates back to at least 1848, when the earliest-known sale of the building is documented.

Legacy

In 1998 the reconstituted MCC congregation in New Orleans (Big Easy Metropolitan Community Church, since renamed again to MCC of New Orleans) held a 25th anniversary service to commemorate the arson and its 32 deaths. This event is significant because, unlike the one it memorialized, the 300 members of the congregation refused to hide their faces and instead insisted on entering and leaving the event through the church's front doors.

In 2008 The North American Convocation of Pro-LGBT Christians planned to hold its "Many Stories, One Voice" event in New Orleans to commemorate the 25th anniversary of the conference (and the 35th anniversary of the tragedy), but eventually canceled the conference for the year due to Hurricane Gustav. In 2008 local artist Skylar Fein constructed an art installation titled Remember the Upstairs Lounge. The New Orleans Museum of Art has since acquired Fein's art exhibit, which includes a reproduction of the bar.

In 2013, noting the 40th anniversary of the fire, the Archbishop of New Orleans, Gregory Michael Aymond, issued a statement of regret that his predecessor, Archbishop Philip Hannan, and the local church leadership ignored the arson attack. Aymond wrote to Time magazine that "In retrospect, if we did not release a statement we should have to be in solidarity with the victims and their families ... The church does not condone violence and hatred. If we did not extend our care and condolences, I deeply apologize."

Depiction in media 
Coverage of the fire by news outlets minimized the fact that LGBT patrons constituted the majority of the victims, while editorials and talk radio hosts made light of the event. No government officials made mention of the fire. As Robert L. Camina, writer/director of a documentary about the fire (Upstairs Inferno), said in 2013, "I was shocked at the disproportionate reaction by the city government. The city declared days of mourning for victims of other mass tragedies in the city. It shocked me that despite the magnitude of the fire, it was largely ignored."

Film and television 
A TAPS group in episode 15, Season 8 of Ghost Hunters visited the lounge to encounter alleged ghosts of the fire's casualties. The episode identified the event as the "Jimani Lounge Massacre." In 2013, Royd Anderson wrote, directed, and produced the first film (a documentary) about the tragedy titled The UpStairs Lounge Fire. On June 24, 2015, the 42nd Anniversary of the Up Stairs Lounge arson, UPSTAIRS INFERNO, a feature length documentary about the tragedy written, directed and produced by Robert L. Camina, had its World Premiere in New Orleans at the historic Prytania Theatre.  The film's narration was provided by New Orleans’ own New York Times best selling author, Christopher Rice (son of novelist Anne Rice).  In February 2017, UPSTAIRS INFERNO was invited to screen at the Library of Congress.  Starting with the World Premiere, public screenings of UPSTAIRS INFERNO have been included in New Orleans' Up Stairs Lounge Arson Anniversary Commemorations repeatedly (2015, 2016 & 2018) On June 24, 2022, the true crime podcast MurderMurderNews covered the arson at the UpStairs Lounge in their 66th episode titled "Arson at Upstairs Lounge".

Theater 
Also in 2013, Wayne Self (a playwright and composer from Natchitoches, Louisiana), first presented a musical called Upstairs about the tragedy. In 2014, Melange Dance Company of New Orleans performed a tribute show as part of the New Orleans Fringe Festival. 'The UpStairs Lounge' show aimed to uplift with a combination of dance and film that celebrate the Lounge, its patrons, and the strides taken towards Human Rights since the incident. In 2015, Melange Dance Company of New Orleans presented an extended performance of 'The UpStairs Lounge' show originally performed as part of the 2014 New Orleans Fringe Festival. In 2017, an Off-Broadway musical called The View Upstairs about The UpStairs Lounge opened at The Lynn Redgrave Theater in New York City.

Books 
In 2014, McFarland & Company released Clayton Delery-Edwards' account of the arson, The Up Stairs Lounge Arson: Thirty-Two Deaths in a New Orleans Gay Bar, June 24, 1973. The book was selected as one of the Louisiana Endowment for the Humanities 2015 Books of the Year. In 2019, The New York Times featured Bill Larson, a victim of the UpStairs Lounge arson attack, in their obituary feature Overlooked. On June 14, 2021, the book The Mayor of Oak Street, written by Vincent Traughber Meis, was published by NineStar Press. It is dedicated to the victims of the UpStairs Lounge arson attack. In 2021, Casey McQuiston published One Last Stop, which features the UpStairs Lounge arson attack. Elizabeth Dias and Jim Downs published an article, "The Horror Upstairs", in Time magazine, July 1, 2013

References

External links
 The Cinema Follies fire, about the October 24, 1977 blaze at a movie cinema in southeast Washington, DC, that killed nine people and caused a political scandal for U.S. Representative Jon C. Hinson of Mississippi, one of four survivors
 Remembering the UpStairs Lounge: The U.S.A.’s Largest LGBT Massacre Happened 40 Years Ago Today (June 24, 2013)
 Matthew Tharrett, "Survivors Of Largest Gay Mass Murder In History Recall Tragedy On 41st Anniversary," Queerty, 24 Jun 2014 (e-pub).
 Arson At The UpStairs Lounge (July 28, 2016)
 Orlando mass shooting is a haunting reminder of Upstairs Lounge arson (June 6, 2016) Also see, Opinion | Before Orlando, There Was New Orleans
 Skylar Fein Upstairs Lounge Fire Collection at  The Historic New Orleans Collection

1973 fires in the United States
1973 in Louisiana
1973 murders in the United States
Arson in Louisiana
Building and structure fires in the United States
Crimes in New Orleans
Fire disasters involving barricaded escape routes
LGBT in Louisiana
Mass murder in 1973
Mass murder in Louisiana
Mass murder in the United States
Massacres of men
Unsolved mass murders in the United States
Metropolitan Community Churches
Nightclub fires
Violence against gay men in the United States
Violence against LGBT people in the United States
Violence against men in North America
June 1973 events in the United States
1973 in LGBT history
1973 disasters in the United States
20th century in New Orleans